The International Association of Geodesy (IAG) is a constituent association of the International Union of Geodesy and Geophysics.

Overview 
The precursors to the IAG were arc measurement campaigns. The IAG was founded in 1862 as the Mitteleuropäische Gradmessung (Central European Arc Measurement), later became the Europäische Gradmessung (European Arc Measurement) in 1867, the Internationale Erdmessung (Association Geodésique Internationale in French and "International Geodetic Association" in English) in 1886, and took its present name in 1946.

At present there are 4 commissions and one inter-commission committee:
Reference Frames
Gravity Field
Geodynamics and Earth Rotation
Positioning & Applications
Inter-commission Committee on Theory

The Global Geodetic Observing System (GGOS) is the observing arm of the IAG that focuses on proving the geodetic infrastructure to measure changes in the earth's shape, rotation and mass distribution.

Journal 

IAG sponsors the Journal of Geodesy, published by Springer as the merger and continuation of Bulletin Géodésique and manuscripta geodaetica; it has an impact factor of 4.528 (2018).

See also 
 Carlos Ibáñez e Ibáñez de Ibero – president of the International Geodetic Association and 1st president of the International Committee for Weights and Measures
Johann Jacob Baeyer – founder of the Mitteleuropaïsche Gradmessung
 History of geodesy
 History of the metre
 International Geodetic Student Organisation
 Seconds pendulum

References

General references
 
 IUGG Report  (2012) pg 47-50

Geodesy organizations
International scientific organizations
International organisations based in Germany
Scientific organizations established in 1940
Earth sciences societies
International geographic data and information organizations